Heilige-Drievuldigheidscollege or the "Holy Trinity College Preparatory School" is a school in the city of Leuven in the Flemish Brabant province of Belgium.

The Holy-Trinity College is a Catholic school established by the Josephites of Belgium in the heart of Leuven. The school has a primary school and a secondary school.  The basic options available to students are modern sciences, Latin and Latin-Greek.  In the second and third grade there is an almost complete range of studies in general secondary education.

History

The school was founded in 1843 by canon Constant van Crombrugghe, founder of the Congregation of the Josephites. The main entrance to the school is located on the edge of the Old Market, the rear of the school is at the Father Damien Square, where the mortal remains of Blessed Damien of Molokai rest in the crypt of the St. Anthony Church. The Josephites also have in Egenhovenbos in Heverlee a country estate for the monks and students since 1870. This was still used until 2010 for reflections and extracurricular activities by the school when it was sold. The estate was leased in 1870 by the Duke of Arenberg. After World War I the property became nationalized and Josephites could purchase the Jozefietengoed in 1924 from the Belgian state. The school itself and the adjoining convent of the order, was badly hit on May 12, 1944, by a bombardment of the Allied air forces.

In 2001, the school joined the school board of the school community:  Leuven Catholic Schools at the Dyle (LKSD)

Famous alumni 
 Charles-Jean de La Vallée Poussin
 Félicien Marceau
 Henry Moeller
 Peter Vandenbempt
 Jef Aerts
 Michel Wuyts
 Luc Steeno
 Philip Verheyen

See also
Holy Trinity

References

External links
 

Catholic schools in Belgium
Education in Leuven
Educational institutions established in 1843
Buildings and structures in Leuven
1843 establishments in Belgium